Photon was a live action television show in the mid-1980s, which was tied into the Photon lasertag arenas and home game. It was produced by DIC Enterprises as a first run syndicated kids series which shown in various syndicated markets through most of the mid eighties. Animator Shinji Aramaki served as miniature model maker/designer on the special effects team for the series.

Premise
Photon followed the adventures of a young high school student, Christopher Jarvis with the alias of "Bhodi Li". Chris discovers that the lasertag game Photon is actually a way to detect the strongest warriors in the galaxy, who will then be recruited to fight the forces of darkness. After shooting his laser gun and saying "The light shines!", he would be transported to a space station to join his fellow Photon Warriors. His alien compatriots include an orphan earthling boy genius named Parcival, a shape-changing blob named Pike, a lizard-like creature named Leon, a cyborg named Lord Baethan, and Tivia, a black ninja princess from Nivia populated by women after the males became extinct. Their mentor is a sentient computer named MOM (Multiple Operation Matrix). The villains' motto is "Let the darkness grow!"

The mission of each faction is to find the Photon crystal on each planet just as it nears the end of its hundred-year charge. If the Photon warriors are the first to shoot the crystal, the planet will be changed into a vital place full of life. If the villains do so, it will become a barren wasteland.

Cast and characters
 Bhodi Li (played by Christopher Lockwood)
 Tivia, Princess of Nivia (played by Loretta Haywood)
 Lord Beathan (played by Graham Ravey)
 Parcival (played by Eros Rivers)
 Leon/Sarge (played by Akiyoshi Ono)
 Uncle Pike (played by Kazuhisa Kanamaru)
 Kathy Jarvis (played by Clarissa Reid)
 Barbara Jarvis (played by Tamara Johnson)
 Richard Jarvis (played by Paul Laroque)
 Pirarr (played by Sam Taylor)
 Mandarr/Evan Kiley (played by David Anthony)
 Warriarr (played by Satoshi Ishihara)
 Dogarr (played by Deiichi Igarashi)
 Bugarr (played by Yoshito Shiraishi)
 Destructarr (played by Yoshito Nagatsuka)

Production
The show was filmed in both the U.S. and Japan. Many of the costumes were designed and worn by people who worked on Super Sentai and other tokusatsu programs in Japan. Production values were rather low, and a majority of the sets were chroma-keyed in.

The show only lasted one season, but it did have a series finale.

Directors: Yasuhiro Horiuchi and Koichi Nakajima.

Writers: Ray Dryden, Tsunehisa Itô, Satoshi Namiki, Sukehiro Tomita.

Rebroadcast
The Club Mario segments of The Super Mario Bros. Super Show! included segments of Photon under the title Spaced Out Theater.

Episodes

Related books
There were a number of book tie-ins, some of them written by popular comic book, TV and sci-fi author Peter David.

Two series of books were planned and started. The series aimed at a younger audience was by David under the pseudonym of David Peters, and 6 books were written. The only published novel of the series aimed at the Young Adult market was written by Michael P. Kube-McDowell under the house name Michael Hudson.

References

External links
 
Series production, game and merchandise article at the Los Angeles Times
 Photon Forever - Fan Site

1986 American television series debuts
1987 American television series endings
1980s American children's television series
1980s American science fiction television series
1980s Japanese television series
Television series by DIC Entertainment
Television series by DHX Media
First-run syndicated television programs in the United States
English-language television shows
American children's science fiction television series
American television shows featuring puppetry
Television series about teenagers